The First Federal League of Yugoslavia's 1952 season (colloquially the Yugoslav First League) was shortened and sped-up. It was completed over a period of little more than three and a half months, beginning on 2 March 1952 and finishing on 22 June 1952. The reason for the changes was a desire to start the next season in the fall of 1952, thus implementing the fall-spring format that had become a norm all across Europe by this time.

The clubs were initially divided into two groups of six teams each, where everyone within a given group played each other twice (home and away).

Then, according to the placement in  these preliminary groups, three new groups were formed:
First two teams in each of the two preliminary groups advanced to the 4-team group, the winner of which would become a champion.
Teams placed 3rd and 4th in each of the two preliminary groups got to move to a 4-team group that would decide final league standings from 5th to 8th place.
The bottom two teams in each of the two preliminary groups moved to a 4-team group that would decide final league standings at the bottom (places 9th through 12th) and thus determine who gets relegated to the Second League.

League

Preliminary stage

Group 1

Group 2

Final round

Championship group

Central group

Relegation group

Top scorers

See also
Yugoslav Cup
Yugoslav League Championship
Football Association of Yugoslavia

External links
Yugoslavia Domestic Football Full Tables

Yugoslav First League seasons
Yugo
1
Yugo
1